Microdes quadristrigata is a moth in the family Geometridae. It is found in New Zealand.

References

Moths described in 1862
Eupitheciini
Moths of New Zealand